Wierzenica  is a village in the administrative district of Gmina Swarzędz, within Poznań County, Greater Poland Voivodeship, in west-central Poland.

The village has a population of 261. It has a church which lies on the Wooden Churches Trail around Puszcza Zielonka.

References

Wierzenica